Muramoylpentapeptide carboxypeptidase (D-alanine carboxypeptidase I, DD-carboxypeptidase, D-alanine carboxypeptidase, D-alanyl-D-alanine carboxypeptidase, D-alanine-D-alanine-carboxypeptidase, carboxypeptidase D-alanyl-D-alanine, carboxypeptidase I, UDP-N-acetylmuramoyl-tetrapeptidyl-D-alanine alanine-hydrolase, D-alanyl-D-alanine peptidase, DD-peptidase, penicillin binding protein 5, PBP5, PdcA, VanY) is an enzyme. This enzyme catalyses the following chemical reaction.

 Cleavage of the bond UDP-N-acetylmuramoyl-L-alanyl-D-gamma-glutamyl-6-carboxy-L-lysyl-D-alanyl--D-alanine

This bacterial enzyme that requires a divalent cation for activity.

References

External links 
 

EC 3.4.17